Deep Sea Research is a peer-reviewed academic journal of deep sea research.  It was established in 1953 by Pergamon Press. In 1962, it renamed itself Deep Sea Research and Oceanographic Abstracts, and returned to the Deep Sea Research title in 1977. In 1978, it split into two journals Deep Sea Research Part A: Oceanographic Research Papers and Deep Sea Research Part B: Oceanographic Literature Review. In 1993, Part A split into Deep Sea Research Part I: Oceanographic Research Papers and Deep Sea Research Part II: Topical Studies in Oceanography, while Part B was discontinued.

The journal is published by Elsevier. Part I is edited by Igor M. Belkin and Imants G. Priede, while Part II is edited by Javier Arístegui and Kenneth Drinkwater.

Abstracting and indexing
Part I is indexed and abstracted in the following bibliographic databases:

while Part II is covered by

According to the Journal Citation Reports, Part I and Part II have 2020 impact factors of 2.955 and 2 2.732 430 respectively.

References

External links
Deep Sea Research Part I; 
Deep Sea Research Part II: 

Oceanography journals
Publications established in 1953
Elsevier academic journals
Monthly journals
English-language journals